The Yale Journal of International Law is a student-edited international law review at the Yale Law School (New Haven, Connecticut). The journal publishes articles, essays, notes, and commentary that cover a wide range of  topics in international and comparative law.

History
The Yale Journal of International Law is the oldest of Yale Law School's eight secondary journals still in publication. The journal was founded in 1974 by a group of students who were followers of the New Haven School of international law, and their publication was originally known as Yale Studies in World Public Order. Under the leadership of then editor in chief Eisuke Suzuki, a graduate fellow from Tokyo, the first issue was produced without assistance from the Law School. After being renamed The Yale Journal of World Public Order, the journal obtained its current title. About ten years after its founding, the Yale Law School started to support the journal.

Content

Some of the journal's most-cited articles include:

Kenneth W. Abbott, Modern International Relations Theory: A Prospectus for International Lawyers, Yale J. Int. Law 14:335 (1989)
Lea Brilmayer, Secession and Self-Determination: A Territorial Interpretation, Yale J. Int. Law 16:177 (1991)
Raidza Torres, The Rights of Indigenous Populations: The Emerging International Norm, Yale J. Int. Law 16:127 (1991)
Michael J. Glennon, Two Views of Presidential Foreign Affairs Power: Little v. Barreme or Curtiss-Wright?, Yale J. Int. Law 13:5 (1988)
Daniel Bodansky, The United Nations Framework Convention on Climate Change: A Commentary, Yale J. Int. Law 18:451 (1993)

Rankings
The journal was ranked second among international law reviews in the 2007 ExpressO Guide to Top Law Reviews based on the number of manuscripts received.

Events
In collaboration with Opinio Juris, occasional online symposia centering on scholarly conversations on articles published in the journal are organized. In collaboration with the Forum on the Practice of International Law, the journal periodically convenes panels, workshops, and talks on diverse topics with guests including Yale faculty, practicing international lawyers, distinguished alumni, and other campus visitors.  In addition, the journal organizes a "works in progress" series at which Yale J.D. and graduate law students present papers to their colleagues with a faculty respondent who provides feedback and constructive criticism. Some recent events are:

Symposium: International Trade in the Trump Era (2019)
The "New" New Haven School (2007)
Nation Building in the Middle East (2005)
Reflections on the International Court of Justice's Oil Platforms Decision (2004)
Current Pressures on International Humanitarian Law (2003)
Reflections on the International Court of Justice’s LaGrand Decision (2002)
Realistic Idealism in International Law, a conference in honor of W. Michael Reisman. Selected proceedings from this conference were published in the Summer 2009 issue.

References

External links 

W. Michael Reisman, "The Vision and Mission of the Yale Journal of International Law", Yale J. Int. Law 25:263 (2000)
Yale Journal of International Law Articles on SSRN

American law journals
International law journals
Yale Law School
Law journals edited by students